R.M.N. is a 2022 drama film written and directed by Cristian Mungiu. Set in a multiethnic village in Transylvania, Romania, during the 2019–20 holiday season, the film follows a man who returns from Germany and his ex-lover who works in the village. Mungiu named the film after a Romanian acronym for nuclear magnetic resonance as the film is "an investigation of the brain, a brain scan trying to detect things below the surface".

The film premiered in competition at the Cannes Film Festival in May 2022.

Cast
 Marin Grigore as Matthias
 Judith State as Csilla
 Macrina Bârlădeanu as Ana
 Orsolya Moldován as Mrs. Dénes
 Andrei Finți as Papa Otto
 Mark Blenyesi as Rudi
 Ovidiu Crișan as Mr. Baciu

Production
Mungiu wrote the screenplay in the spring of 2021. Filming took place from November 2021 to January 2022 in Rimetea and other villages across Transylvania.

Release
The film premiered at the 2022 Cannes Film Festival in the main competition. In May 2022, IFC Films acquired the North American rights ahead of the premiere.

It also screened at the 2022 Toronto International Film Festival, in the Contemporary World Cinema category.

References

External links
 

2020s Romanian-language films
2020s Hungarian-language films
2020s German-language films
2020s English-language films
2022 drama films
2022 films
Romanian drama films
French drama films
Belgian drama films
Films set in Transylvania
Films shot in Romania
Films directed by Cristian Mungiu
2022 multilingual films
Romanian multilingual films
French multilingual films
Belgian multilingual films
2020s French films